Maurice Meslans (1862–1938) was a French pharmacist and chemist, Henri Moissan's advanced student, and a pioneer in organofluorocompounds chemistry.

References

1862 births
1938 deaths
20th-century French chemists
Nancy-Université alumni
19th-century French chemists